Alpha Group Co., Ltd. is a Chinese multinational conglomerate with animation, toy, mass media asset and entertainment company headquartered created by Cai Dongqing in 1993. In 2016, it changed name from Alpha Animation (in short 奥飞动漫/ 奧飛動漫/ Aòfēi Dòngmàn, English: Guangdong Alpha Animation and Culture Company). The company has a Chinese webcomics site, U17, and also an American film company, Alpha Pictures, and has announced the creation of an animation division also based in the United States.

History

Auldey Toys
In 1993, Cai Dongqing spent 800,000 RMB to establish Auldeytoys company in Chenghai County, Shantou City, Guangdong Province, China. But the company couldn't develop, so in order to solve this trouble Cai established "Guangzhou Alpha Culture Spread Company".

Alpha Animation
In 2006, Alpha Animation used ads to sell "yo-yo" ball, and Blazing Teens (Chinese: 火力少年王).
In 2007, Alpha was transformed to establish "Guangdong Alpha Animation and Culture Company".

In 2012, Alpha Animation partnered with Hasbro to co-develop brands for China and other global markets. One of the brands selected was Alpha's Blazing Teens series, alongside an unnamed Hasbro property. The first results from this collaboration include Blazing Team and a Kre-O line of toys based on Alpha's Armor Hero franchise, both of which launched in late 2015.

Subsidiaries

Creative Power Entertaining

Creative Power Entertaining Co., Ltd. (CPE) (Simplified Chinese: 广东原创动力文化传播有限公司, Traditional: 廣東原創動力文化傳播有限公司, Pinyin: Guǎngdōng Yuánchuàng Dònglì Wénhuà Chuánbō Yǒuxiàngōngsī, in short 原创动力/ 原創動力/ Yuánchuàng Dònglì) is a Chinese animation company, established in 2004. It was purchased by Alpha Animation in October 2013.

Mingxin Chuangyi Cartoon
Guangdong Mingxin Chuangyi Cartoon Co., Ltd. (Simplified Chinese: 广东明星创意动画有限公司, Traditional: 廣東明星創意動畫有限公司, Pinyin: Guǎngdōng Míngxīng Chuàngyì Dònghuà Yǒuxiàngōngsī, in short 明星动画/ 明星動畫/ Míngxīng Dònghuà) (Former Happytoon Computer Entertainment Inc.), in short "MSC Co., Ltd." is a studio created by “the father of Pleasant Goat”, Huang Wei-ming, after he left Creative Power Entertaining. In July 2012, he did not have enough money to make animation, so Alpha Group purchased 70% of the shares.

Siyue Xinkong
Beijing Siyue Xinkong Network Technology Co., Ltd. (Simplified Chinese: 北京四月星空网络技术有限公司, Traditional: 北京四月星空網絡技術有限公司, Pinyin: Běijīng Sìyuè Xīngkōng Wǎngluò Jìshù Yǒuxiàngōngsī) is a Chinese animation website and Cartoon business, established in May 2009, which has a Cartoon website "u17". On the evening of 11 August 2015, Alpha Animation announced it spent 904 million RMB to purchase it 100% of the shares, according "cash and stock".

Jia-jia Cartoon Channel
Guangdong Radio and Television Jia-jia Cartoon Channel (Simplified Chinese: 广东广播电视台嘉佳卡通频道, Traditional: 廣東廣播電視台嘉佳卡通頻道, Pinyin: Guǎngdōng Guǎngbò Diànshìtái Jiā Jiā Kǎtōng Píndào, in short 嘉佳卡通频道/ 嘉佳卡通頻道/ Jiā Jiā Kǎtōng Píndào) starting broadcasting on September 16, 2006, it was licensed by SARFT, and it belongs to Southern Media Group, Guangdong Radio and Television's Animation TV channels. In 2010, Alpha Animation purchased 60% of the shares, getting 30-year broadcasting rights. In the middle of 2011, Jia-jia started broadcasting to China on satellite.

Filmography

Films

 Cast Away (2000)
 Armor Hero Atlas (2014)
 The Strange House (2015)
 Balala the Fairies: Princess Camellia (2015)
 Armor Hero Captor King (2016)
 Armor Hero Emperor (2010)
 Armor Hero Hunter Movie (TBA)
 Assassin's Creed (2016) (partial financing)
 Backkom Bear: Agent 008 (2017)
 Balala the Fairies: the Movie (2013)
 Meet the Pegasus (2014)
 Paris Holiday (2015)
 The Mermaid (2016)
 Pleasant Goat and Big Big Wolf – Amazing Pleasant Goat (2015)
 Pleasant Goat and Big Big Wolf - Dunk for Future (2022)
 One Hundred Thousand Bad Jokes 2 (2017)
 The Flash and Dash Movie - 3D Movie (July 12 2021)
 Agent Backkom: Kings Bear (2021)
 Extinct (2021)
 The Revenant (2015) (partial financing)

Television series

 Game of Thrones (2012)
 Aggretsuko (2018-present)
 Squid Game (2021)
 Pikwik Pack (2020)
 Backkom (2020)
 Armor Hero (2008)
 Armor Hero Captor (2015)
 Armor Hero Captor King (2017)
 Armor Hero Hunter (2018-2020)
 Armor Hero Lava (2013)
 Armor Hero XT  (2011)
 Battle Strike Team: Giant Saver (2012)
 Battle Strike Team: Railway Vanguard (2020)
 Battle Strike Team: Rescue Engine (2016)
 Battle Strike Team: Space Deleter (2014)
 Balala the Fairies (2008–present)
 Blazing Team (2015–2017, co-production with Hasbro Studios)
 Blazing Teens (2006–2015)
 Dragon Warrior (2003-2011)
 Electro Boy (2008–2013)
 Flash and Dash (2008-2012)
 Go For Speed (2008)
 Hover Champs (2011)
 The Family of Greenwood (2006)
 Infinity Nado (2012–2018)
 King of Warrior EX (2007)
 Legends of Spark (2021)
 Mask Master (2013)
 Paboo & Mojies (2012-2015)
 Peek a Boo (2021)
 Nana Moon (2013)
 Opti-Morphs/Screechers Wild! (2016-2018)
 Pleasant Goat and Big Big Wolf (2005–present)
 Rev and Roll (2019)
 Super Wings (2015–present)
 Show By Rock (2017)
 The Legend of Armor Hero (2018)
 The Mechnimals (2011)
 Vary Peri (2012–2013)
 Katuri (2018)
 Jing-ju Cats (2015)
 Chicago P.D. (2014)
 Chicago Fire (2012)
 Chicago Justice (2017)
 Chicago Med (2015)
 Archer (2009)
 Littlest Pet Shop (2021)
 Balala The Fairies: Kirakira Recipe a la Mode (2017)

References

External links
 Auldeytoys official website 

Chinese animation studios
Toy companies of China
Companies based in Shantou
Mass media companies established in 1993
Chinese companies established in 1993
Companies listed on the Shenzhen Stock Exchange
Manufacturing companies established in 1993
Toy companies established in 1993